was a professional wrestling pay-per-view (PPV) event produced by the New Japan Pro-Wrestling (NJPW) promotion, which took place at the Tokyo Dome in Tokyo, Japan on January 4, 2008. It was the 17th January 4 Tokyo Dome Show and the second held under the "Wrestle Kingdom" name. The event featured ten matches, four of which were contested for championships. Wrestle Kingdom is traditionally NJPW's biggest event of the year and has been described as their equivalent to WWE's WrestleMania.

As part of a new working relationship, the show featured wrestlers from the Orlando, Florida-based Total Nonstop Action Wrestling (TNA) promotion. The matches involving TNA wrestlers were shown as a special Global Impact! broadcast in the United States. TNA wrestlers were involved in six of the ten matches, which included Kurt Angle making a successful defense of the Inoki Genome Federation's version of the IWGP Heavyweight Championship (known as the IWGP 3rd Belt Championship in NJPW) against Yuji Nagata. The show also featured wrestlers from All Japan Pro Wrestling (AJPW), Dradition and Pro Wrestling Zero1-Max.

Storylines
Wrestle Kingdom II featured ten professional wrestling matches that involved different wrestlers from pre-existing scripted feuds and storylines. Wrestlers portrayed villains, heroes, or less distinguishable characters in the scripted events that built tension and culminated in a wrestling match or series of matches.

Through NJPW's relationship with the American Total Nonstop Action Wrestling (TNA), the event featured several TNA wrestlers, headlined by Kurt Angle, who was in possession of the "IWGP 3rd Belt Championship". In October 2005, Brock Lesnar won NJPW's top title, the IWGP Heavyweight Championship. The following July, he refused to return and defend the title, claiming he was owed money. NJPW stripped Lesnar of the title and went on to crown a new champion, who was given the older second generation IWGP Heavyweight Championship title belt, while Lesnar retained physical possession of the third generation belt. In June 2007, Lesnar returned to Japan with the title belt, announcing he was going to defend it at Inoki Genome Federation's debut show in Tokyo's Sumo Hall. Lesnar went on to lose the title to TNA wrestler Kurt Angle. On November 17, NJPW announced that Angle, whom they dubbed "IWGP 3rd Belt Champion", would take part in the January 4 Tokyo Dome show, where he would defend his title against NJPW wrestler Yuji Nagata.

After announcing Angle's participation in the event, NJPW announced that the entire Wrestle Kingdom II show would have a "NJPW vs. TNA" theme with six matches pitting wrestlers from the two companies against each other.

Event

In the main event of the show, Shinsuke Nakamura defeated Hiroshi Tanahashi to capture the IWGP Heavyweight Championship for the first time in four years. In the semi-main event, TNA representative Kurt Angle successfully defended the "IWGP 3rd Belt Championship" against Yuji Nagata. Following the main event, Angle confronted Nakamura, setting up a championship unification match between the two.

The opening match of the show was the first of the six "NJPW vs. TNA" matches on the show and saw TNA's A.J. Styles, Christian Cage and Petey Williams defeat NJPW's Milano Collection A.T., Minoru and Prince Devitt. In the second match, NJPW's Wataru Inoue made his first successful defense of the IWGP Junior Heavyweight Championship against TNA's Christopher Daniels. The next match saw NJPW's Manabu Nakanishi defeat TNA's Abyss. The fifth match of the show was contested under hardcore rules and saw TNA's Team 3D (Brother Devon and Brother Ray) defeat NJPW's Togi Makabe and Toru Yano to tie the series.

Prior to the IWGP Tag Team Championship match between champions, NJPW representatives Giant Bernard and Travis Tomko, and challengers, TNA representatives The Steiner Brothers (Rick and Scott), TNA founder Jeff Jarrett entered the ring to talk about the relationship between the two companies. He then sat ringside with NJPW president Naoki Sugabayashi for the next match. Towards the end of the match, Jarrett went to interfere and hit Bernard with a guitar, but was stopped by Togi Makabe and Toru Yano. While Jarrett was busy hitting Yano with his guitar, Bernard and Tomko won the match after pinning Rick with their Magic Killer finisher. With Angle's win over Nagata, the series between NJPW and TNA ended tied 3–3.

In addition to the TNA wrestlers, the event also featured other outside participants. All Japan Pro Wrestling (AJPW) performer Keiji Mutoh wrestled his first NJPW match under his masked alter ego "The Great Muta" in seven years and eight months, defeating NJPW's Hirooki Goto. In addition, wrestlers from Dradition and Pro Wrestling Zero1-Max took part in a ten-man tag team match, where veteran wrestler Tatsumi Fujinami picked up the win.

Reception
Following Wrestle Kingdom II, Dave Meltzer of the Wrestling Observer Newsletter saw NJPW's annual January 4 Tokyo Dome show "hovering on extinction". While NJPW announced an attendance of 27,000, Meltzer claimed a real attendance of 20,000 with roughly half paid. According to Meltzer "nobody could reasonably expect much more than 10,000 paid for New Japan, so by modern standards getting the place packed and having a good show up-and-down is considered a success". According to Meltzer, NJPW was happy with "how things went with TNA" with the company's management feeling that the American promotion had "plenty of good workers". In addition to the bigger name wrestlers such as Kurt Angle, Team 3D and The Steiner Brothers, A.J. Styles and Petey Williams were said to have impressed Japanese fans.

Aftermath
On February 17, 2008, Shinsuke Nakamura defeated Kurt Angle to unify the two versions of the IWGP Heavyweight Championship. Afterwards, both the second and third generation title belts were retired with Nakamura being awarded a brand new belt to represent the IWGP Heavyweight Championship. The fourth generation belt was created to symbolically end the issues surrounding the championship and start anew.

Results

See also

TNA Global Impact!

References

External links
NJPW.co.jp 

2008 in professional wrestling
2008 in Tokyo
Wrestle Kingdom 2
January 2008 events in Japan
Events in Tokyo